Sulejman Smajić (born 13 August 1984) is a Bosnian retired professional footballer and sporting director of First League of FBiH club NK Metalleghe-BSI.

As a player, he also played for the Bosnia and Herzegovina U21 national team and the Bosnia and Herzegovina full national team.

Club career
Smajić was a very creative midfielder whose career began in NK Iskra Bugojno, there he was spotted by HŠK Zrinjski Mostar who he joined in 2001. In 2003 he was transferred to Iskra on a season long loan. After coming back from his loan, he managed to win the championship title with Zrinjski in the Premier League of Bosnia and Herzegovina in 2005 and three years later, in 2008, the Bosnian Cup. After seven years at Zrinjski, he left the club and joined FCV Dender in the summer of 2008.

On 7 July 2009, Lokeren then signed Smajić from Dender on a three-year deal. In 2011, Smajić signed with Bosnian cup winners FK Željezničar Sarajevo. During his time with Željezničar, he won two Premier League titles and one cup. In June 2013, he joined FK Olimpik. He won the Bosnian Cup with Olimpik in 2015.

In 2016, Smajić left Olimpik and joined NK Metalleghe-BSI. In January 2019, Smajić decided to end his football career while at Metalleghe.

International career
Smajić has played for the Under-21 team and made one senior appearance for Bosnia and Herzegovina, coming on as a late substitute for Mirko Hrgović in an October 2006 European Championship qualification match away against Moldova.

Honours

Player

Club
Zrinjski Mostar
Bosnian Premier League: 2004–05
Bosnian Cup: 2007–08
Željezničar Sarajevo
Bosnian Premier League: 2011–12, 2012–13
Bosnian Cup: 2011–12
Olimpik Sarajevo
Bosnian Cup: 2014–15

References

External links

Sulejman Smajić at Football-Lineups

1984 births
Living people
People from Jajce
Association football wingers
Bosnia and Herzegovina footballers
Bosnia and Herzegovina under-21 international footballers
Bosnia and Herzegovina international footballers
HŠK Zrinjski Mostar players
NK Iskra Bugojno players
F.C.V. Dender E.H. players
K.S.C. Lokeren Oost-Vlaanderen players
FK Željezničar Sarajevo players
FK Olimpik players
NK Metalleghe-BSI players
Premier League of Bosnia and Herzegovina players
First League of the Federation of Bosnia and Herzegovina players
Belgian Pro League players
Bosnia and Herzegovina expatriate footballers
Expatriate footballers in Belgium
Bosnia and Herzegovina expatriate sportspeople in Belgium